Linsidemore is a tiny township on the north bank of the Kyle of Sutherland in the Scottish Highlands.

References

Populated places in Sutherland